Henry Thompson was an English professional footballer who played as a left back in the Football League for Newcastle United.

Personal life 
Thompson served in the Royal Garrison Artillery during the First World War.

Career statistics

References 

English Football League players
Place of death missing
Newcastle United F.C. players
English footballers
Year of death missing
British Army personnel of World War I
1886 births
People from South Hetton
Footballers from County Durham
Association football fullbacks
Royal Garrison Artillery soldiers
North Shields F.C. players
Crystal Palace F.C. players
Southern Football League players
Military personnel from County Durham